Sword in the Shadows is a 1961 Italian swashbuckler film directed  by Luigi Capuano and starring Tamara Lees and Livio Lorenzon.

Plot

Cast 
 
Tamara Lees as   Countess Ottavia della Rocca
Livio Lorenzon as  Captain  Mellina
 Gabriella Farinon as  Lavinia (credited as Gaby Farinon)
 Mario Valdemarin  as  Fabrizio
Germano Longo as  Braccio
 Pina Cornel as  Iolanda
Gianni Rizzo as  Giorgio
 Lydia Johnson  as  Marta
Loris Gizzi as  Zio Roger
Gianni Solaro as  Capitano delle guardie
 Diego Michelotti  as  Fabio
Tullio Altamura as  Duke Ercole Altavilla 
Ugo Sasso as   Baccio's Servant
 Gianni Baghino  as  Zingano
Ignazio Balsamo as  Zingano 
Piero Pastore as  Guard

References

External links

  
1961 adventure films
Italian adventure films 
Italian swashbuckler films
Films directed by Luigi Capuano
1960s Italian-language films
1960s Italian films